Al-Dhafar Sport Club, is an Iraqi football team based in Baghdad, that plays in the Iraq Division Three.

Managerial history
 Murtadha Sabah

See also
 2020–21 Iraq FA Cup

References

External links
 Al-Dhafar SC on Goalzz.com
 Iraq Clubs- Foundation Dates

2019 establishments in Iraq
Association football clubs established in 2019
Football clubs in Baghdad